This is a list of the National Register of Historic Places listings in Knox County, Maine.

This is intended to be a complete list of the properties and districts on the National Register of Historic Places in Knox County, Maine, United States.  Latitude and longitude coordinates are provided for many National Register properties and districts; these locations may be seen together in a map.

There are 97 properties and districts listed on the National Register in the county; 10 of the properties are National Historic Landmarks.  One property was once listed, but has since been removed.

Current listings

|}

Former and moved listings

|}

See also

 List of National Historic Landmarks in Maine
 National Register of Historic Places listings in Maine

References

Knox